Maryam Fatima is a Pakistani Model and Television Drama Actress. She made her acting debut in January 2016 with a leading role in Hum TV drama serial Lagao alongside Zainab Qayyum and Adnan Jaffar. She has played the lead role of Ujala in ARY Digital's series Kab Mere Kehlaoge.

She also appeared in Hum TV's drama serial Udaari which is a co-production of Momina Duraid Productions and Kashf Foundation. She appeared as vocalist with Farhan Saeed singing for Udaari OST before Urwa Hocane took over her in the band.

Filmography

Television

Modeling

TV commercials 
 Golden Sun KKC
 Nesfruta

References

External links 

 
 Maryam Fatima in TV serials
 Maryam Fatima in Drama Serial Lagao
 Maryam Fatima in Drama Serial Udaari
 Maryam Fatima in Drama Serial Zara Yaad Kar

Pakistani television actresses
Actresses from Karachi
Pakistani female models
1997 births
Living people